This is a list of fossiliferous stratigraphic units in Armenia.



List of fossiliferous stratigraphic units

See also 
 Geology of Armenia
 List of fossiliferous stratigraphic units in Azerbaijan
 List of fossiliferous stratigraphic units in Georgia
 List of fossiliferous stratigraphic units in Russia
 List of fossiliferous stratigraphic units in Turkey

References 

Fossiliferous stratigraphic units
Paleontology in Armenia
 Armenia
 Armenia
Fossiliferous stratigraphic units